The following table ranks the 50 highest United States counties or county-equivalents by mean elevation. This list uses the "mean of extremes" elevation which is the arithmetic mean of the highest and lowest elevations. The highest U.S. county by mean elevation is Lake County, Colorado, the location of Mount Elbert and Mount Massive, the two highest summits of the Rocky Mountains of the United States and Canada. Of these 50 highest counties, 34 counties are located in Colorado, four counties in Wyoming, four counties in New Mexico, three counties in Utah, two boroughs in Alaska, and one county each in California, Idaho, and Nevada.


Highest U.S. counties

Gallery

See also

Lists of counties in the United States
Index of U.S. counties
List of United States counties and county equivalents
Lists of highest points
Geography of the United States
Outline of the United States

Notes

References

External links

National Geodetic Survey
Finding Survey Marks and Datasheets
United States Geological Survey
National Map Search
Elevation Point Query Service

Lists of counties of the United States
Counties of the United States
Counties, List of highest United States
United States, List of highest counties
United States, List of highest counties